Footner Lake is a settlement in northern Alberta, Canada within Mackenzie County. The nearby lake of the same name has the name of Hulbert Footner, a Canadian novelist.

The High Level/Footner Lake Water Aerodrome is located immediately west of the settlement, on Footner Lake.

See also 
List of communities in Alberta
List of settlements in Alberta

References 

Localities in Mackenzie County